In computer graphics, non-uniform rational mesh smooth (NURMS) or subdivision surface technique is typically applied to a low-polygonal mesh to create a high-polygonal smoothed mesh.

Usage
NURMS are used in commercial 3D packages such as Autodesk 3ds Max to perform mesh smoothing operations. The mesh smooth modifier in 3ds Max operates by applying this algorithm to a low-polygon mesh and creates a high-polygon smoothed mesh. The new mesh can be dynamically manipulated by the low-polygon mesh to achieve the desired results. 
There is also an Adobe Illustrator filter that uses the same algorithm of smoothing for 2d curves.

External links
 Head Modeling, 3D Studio Max tutorial 

Computer graphic techniques